Matthew Vellanickal (born 25 September 1934) is a New Testament scholar and a vicar general of the Syro-Malabar Catholic Archdiocese of Changanassery.

Studies and work
Matthew Vellanickal pursued doctoral studies in the discipline of New Testament at the Pontifical Biblical Institute, Rome under the Belgian New Testament Exegete Ignatius de la Potterie and was awarded the doctoral degree in 1970 based on his dissertation The Divine Sonship of Christians in the Johannine Writings. He was a member of the Pontifical Biblical Commission from 1978 to 1984, and President of the Paurastya Vidyapitham (Pontifical Oriental Institute of Religious Studies), Kottayam from 1982 to 1994. He was also Professor of New Testament at St. Thomas Apostolic Seminary, Kottayam.

Writings
 The Divine Sonship of Christians in the Johannine Writings
 Studies in the Gospel of John
 Biblical prayer experience
 Church: Communion of Individual Churches - Biblico-Theological Perspectives on the Communion Ecclesiology of Vatican II
 Biblical Theology of Evangelization
 Biblical Theology of the Individual Churches
 Biblico-Theological Foundations of Ecclesial Identity
 Ecclesial Communion: A Biblical Perspective
 Evangelization in the Johannine Writings
 The Christian Community as a Bearer of the Good News
 The Pauline Doctrine of Christian Sonship
 Understanding of Evangelization in the context of present-day India

References

New Testament scholars
Indian Christian theologians
Indian biblical scholars
Indian lecturers
Christian clergy from Kottayam
Syro-Malabar priests
Living people
1934 births
Pontifical Biblical Institute alumni